Gurgura is a woreda in the chartered city of Dire Dawa in Ethiopia.

Naming 
It is named after  the Gurgura clan which traces its genealogy to the Dir clan family of the Somalis.

History 
The woreda of Gurgura was in existence as early as 1964, when its administrative center was at Kersa.

Demographics 
Based on figures published by the Central Statistical Agency in 2005, this woreda has an estimated total population of 116,250, of whom 58,004 are men and 58,246 are women; 14,250 or 12.26% of its population are urban dwellers, which is less than the average for entire chartered city of 74.4. With an estimated area of 1,195.52 square kilometers, Gurgura has an estimated population density of 97.2 people per square kilometer, which is less than the average for the administrative region of 328.

The 1994 national census reported a total population for this woreda of 87,013 in 15,827 households, of whom 45,098 were men and 41,915 were women; 8,337 or 9.58% of its population were urban dwellers. The three largest ethnic groups reported in Gurgura were the Oromo (81.48%), the Somali (16.53%), and the Amhara (1.24%); all other ethnic groups made up 0.75% of the population. Oromiffa is spoken as a first language by 82.29%, 15.77% Somali and 1.39% speak Amharic; the remaining 0.55% spoke all other primary languages reported. The majority of the inhabitants were Muslim, with 98.34% of the population reporting that as their faith, while 1.48% practiced Ethiopian Orthodox Christianity. Concerning education, 7.98% of the population were considered literate. Concerning sanitary conditions, 90% of the urban houses and 31% of all houses had access to safe drinking water at the time of the census; 37% of the urban and about 7% of the total had toilet facilities.

Censuses record that Oromo are the greatest percentage of the Gurgura woreda, based on the number who speak the Oromo language. But the Gurgura clan share both Somali and Oromo identities, speaking the Oromo language and tracing their genealogy to the Dir, a Somali clan family. Gurgura are mentioned in the Futuh Al Habasha : Conquest of Abyssinia as source dating back as far as the 16th century as Somalis who fought alongside Ahmed Gran. So most inhabitants are of the Gurgura clan.

Notes 

Dire Dawa
Districts of Ethiopia